Alsophis antillensis, the Guadeloupe racer, Antilles racer, or Leeward racer, is a species of snake endemic to the Caribbean island of Guadeloupe.

Description
It can reach nearly a meter in length.  It feeds on lizards and small rodents.  It rarely bites humans, but may release a foul-smelling (though harmless) cloacal secretion when disturbed.

Taxonomy
Alsophis sibonius from Dominica and Alsophis manselli from Montserrat were previously considered subspecies, but are now considered their own species.

References

External links

Alsophis
Snakes of the Caribbean
Endemic fauna of Guadeloupe
Reptiles of Guadeloupe
Reptiles described in 1837
Taxa named by Hermann Schlegel